A Clear Perception is the debut album by British metalcore band The Eyes of a Traitor. The album was released in Europe on Listenable Records in Europe on 23 February and then in United States on 10 March.

The album was originally scheduled to be released on 2 February through the independent distributor, Pinnacle Distribution however because of the economic crisis, the company was forced to go into administration, as of 3 December 2008. Warner Brothers took control of distribution.

On 18 September 2010, The Eyes of a Traitor announced that they were planning to release an Extended play consisting of 4 re-recorded tracks from the debut album. The four tracks were confirmed to be: Under Siege, Escape These Walls, Like Clockwork and The Impact of Two Hearts. It was originally announced to be released around Christmas time but was delayed indefinitely. Justin Lowe, the guitarist of metalcore band After the burial mixed the tracks while Ed Sokolowski produced them. Progress on the completion on the EP was hindered because of After the Burial touring with As I Lay Dying.

Track listing

Release history

Personnel 
The Eyes of a Traitor
 Jack Delany – vocals
 Stephen Whitworth – guitars
 Matthew Pugh – guitars
 Paul Waudby – bass
 Sam Brennan – drums

Additional Personnel
Produced by Ed Sokolowski
Equipment by Norbert Achtelik
Management by Laurent Merle
Design by Lee Boyce

References

2009 debut albums
The Eyes of a Traitor albums
Albums produced by Ed Sokolowski